Sandra Phyllis "Sandy" Knott (October 9, 1937 – June 26, 2013) was an American middle-distance runner. She competed in the women's 800 metres at the 1964 Summer Olympics.

References

External links
 

1937 births
2013 deaths
Sportspeople from Worcester, Massachusetts
Track and field athletes from Massachusetts
American female middle-distance runners
American female cross country runners
Olympic track and field athletes of the United States
Athletes (track and field) at the 1964 Summer Olympics
21st-century American women